Sawt may refer to:
 Sawt (music), a folk music genre from Kuwait and Bahrain
 Śawt, a letter in the Ge'ez alphabet
 Rio Turbio Airport, Argentina (ICAO code: SAWT)